The Border War is the name of a college rivalry between the athletic teams of the Colorado State University Rams and the University of Wyoming Cowboys/Cowgirls.

Background
Colorado State University is a public university in Fort Collins, Colorado, and the University of Wyoming is a public university in Laramie, Wyoming. The two campuses are around 65 miles apart via U.S. Route 287. Both teams compete in the Mountain Division of the Mountain West Conference.

Football
The football rivalry between the two schools dates back to Thanksgiving Day, November 30, 1899. In the first ever matchup between the two schools and the first game that Colorado Agricultural (now known as Colorado State) ever played outside of Colorado, a disagreement between officials from the two schools resulted in a controversial ending to the game.

At the time, officials were provided by the schools competing in the game. The game concluded with a Wyoming forfeit being called after Colorado Agricultural official Edward House ruled that Wyoming official E.D. McArthur and the Wyoming team were refusing to abide by the rulebook. After the forfeit was called and the Colorado Agricultural players began leaving the field, official McArthur reportedly exclaimed that he "did not give a damn for the rules" and instructed the Wyoming team to run in a touchdown. This action reportedly set off a brawl between the teams. Following the game, Colorado Agricultural President Barton Aylesworth declared that his school would not play Wyoming in any athletic event until he received a written apology from Wyoming. The two schools played again the following year, and there has remained bad blood between the two programs since.

Bronze Boot

As the main component of the Border War rivalry, the football rivalry series revolves around the Bronze Boot - a traveling trophy awarded to the winner of the CSU-Wyoming football game each year.

In 1968, the ROTC detachments of the respective schools initiated the Bronze Boot. The boot was worn in the Vietnam War by Cpt. Dan J. Romero, an Adams State College graduate and Army ROTC instructor at CSU between 1967 and 1969. Each year leading up to the Colorado State–Wyoming game, the game ball is carried in a running shuttle relay by the ROTC detachment of the visiting team along US 287 to the Colorado–Wyoming border, where the home team's ROTC detachment receives it and runs the game ball to the stadium hosting the game. The trophy is guarded by the ROTC unit of the past year's winning school during the game.

Game results

† = This game is controversial, but was ruled as a Wyoming forfeit per rule.

Men's basketball

The "Border War" between Colorado State and Wyoming also extends to men's basketball. The ESPN College Basketball Encyclopedia considers Colorado State to be Wyoming's "fiercest rival". Wyoming leads the series 137–102 over Colorado State as of 2023.

Notable men's basketball games
January 27, 1951: Colorado State beat AP No. 20 Wyoming 62–38.
February 14, 1987: Wyoming won 81–78 in triple overtime. Wyoming's Reggie Fox made a tying three pointer to force the second overtime, and Turk Boyd also hit a three to force the third overtime. The ESPN College Basketball Encyclopedia considers this the greatest Border War game of all time.
January 23, 1988: Colorado State upset AP No. 17 Wyoming 54–49.
March 11, 1988: No. 14 Wyoming beat Colorado State 60–58 in the WAC men's basketball tournament semifinal and would eventually become tournament champions. With two seconds left and the game tied at 58, Eric Leckner caught a three-quarter-court-length inbounds pass at the top of the key, turned, and made a 19-foot buzzer-beating jumper falling down, to win the game for Wyoming.
March 9, 2000: In both schools' first seasons in the Mountain West Conference, Wyoming beat Colorado State 74–68 in quarterfinal round of the inaugural MWC basketball tournament, held at the Thomas & Mack Center in Las Vegas.
March 13, 2003: In the quarterfinal round of the MWC tournament, No. 6 seed Colorado State beat No. 3 Wyoming 74–71. Colorado State would go on to win the tournament and a berth in the NCAA tournament.
March 6, 2013: Colorado State won at Laramie, 78–56. However, this game became controversial because Wyoming students chanted "alcoholic" at Colorado State coach Larry Eustachy, a recovering alcoholic. At the game, fliers created by interns at the Wyoming athletics marketing office were distributed and made light of an infamous 2003 photo showing Eustachy, then the head coach at Iowa State, partying with University of Missouri students after the Missouri Tigers beat Iowa State. Wyoming's athletic director apologized for the students' behavior.
January 31, 2018: 14–7 (5–3 conf) Wyoming beat 10–13 (3–7 conf) Colorado State 91–86 in double overtime in Fort Collins. The Rams had two players record double-doubles — Deion James, who recorded 24 points and 14 rebounds and Nico Carvacho, who recorded 10 points and 13 rebounds. Hayden Dalton led Wyoming with 26 points.
February 23, 2019: Colorado State won in Fort Collins, beating Wyoming 83–48. The 35 point differential became the largest margin of victory in the history of the Border War series.
January 31, 2022: 16–2 (6–2 conf) Colorado State traveled north to Laramie to take on 16–3 (5–1 conf) Wyoming on January 31, 2022. Regulation ended with the Rams and Cowboys tied at 70, and the Cowboys outscored the Rams 14–8 in overtime to hand the Rams their first back-to-back loss of the season. David Roddy led the Rams in scoring with 23 points before fouling out in overtime. Roddy made 9 of 15 shots — including 4 of 5 three-pointers — but struggled at the free-throw line, missing 2 of 3 shots including one that would've won the game at the end of regulation. Hunter Maldonado led scoring for the Cowboys by recording a new career-high 35 points, which marked the second consecutive game where the Rams allowed an opposing player to set a new career-high. Graham Ike recorded 16 points and 8 rebounds for the Cowboys before fouling out in overtime along with Roddy.

Game results
Rankings are from the AP Poll. Source for results:

Women's basketball

University of Wyoming records list two women's basketball games played against Colorado State University during the 1973–1974 season, prior to Colorado State's inaugural season. According to Colorado State records, the first game played against Wyoming was on January 29, 1975, in Laramie.

Game results
Source for results:

See also 
 List of NCAA college football rivalry games
 List of most-played college football series in NCAA Division I

References

External links
 University of Wyoming page about the trophy

College football rivalries in the United States
College basketball rivalries in the United States
Colorado State Rams football
Colorado State Rams basketball
Wyoming Cowboys football
Wyoming Cowboys and Cowgirls basketball